The Learning Curve is a Radio 4 current affairs series on the topic of British education, running from 1998 to 2008.

History
The first programme was at 4pm on Tuesday April 7, 1998;
it was followed by Shop Talk, a business programme with Heather Payton.

It was originated by Clare McGinn (who herself studied American Literature from 1988 to 1992 at the University of East Anglia), who is now responsible for BBC Radio's podcasts.

The last programme was on Monday 17 November 2008.

Structure
The weekly programme was thirty minutes and involved interviews with three to four sets of guests. The programme interviewed vice-chancellors of universities.

Production
A former producer was Dorothy Stiven, a former Scottish actress who later worked at Teachers TV, and had worked at the TES in the late 1990s as a journalist.

References

External links
 BBC Radio 4
 BBC School Radio
 British Council Education in the UK

Learning
Educational broadcasting in the United Kingdom
1998 radio programme debuts
2008 radio programme endings